Severin Lüthi (born 5 January 1976) is a Swiss tennis coach and former player. He has coached the Swiss Davis Cup Team for many years and has also been a long-time coach of Roger Federer.

Lüthi grew up in Stettlen, on the outskirts of Bern. He played tennis in his youth and once beat Gustavo Kuerten. He gave up tennis at the age of 20 and served a commercial apprenticeship with his father's company.

He briefly attended university, but found that it did not interest him. Instead, he got involved in sports, first soccer, then as assistant coach of the Swiss Davis Cup team in 2002 when Peter Carter was killed in an automobile accident in South Africa. After three years, he was promoted to team captain.

He has toured with Federer since 2007.

He coached the team that won the Davis Cup for Switzerland in November 2014, as Roger Federer beat Richard Gasquet.

References

Biography on the Credit Suisse site (no longer available)

Swiss tennis coaches
1976 births
Living people
People from Bern-Mittelland District
Sportspeople from the canton of Bern